Francisco Solano Patiño (1923 – 17 June 1990) was a Paraguayan football striker.

Career
Born in Formosa, Argentina, Solano Patiño moved to Paraguay where he played football with Club Sol de América and Club Guaraní. In 1950, he moved abroad to play in the Colombian league with Boca Juniors de Cali. He had a brief spell in the Argentina Primera Division with Club Atlético Huracán during 1954, before moving to Colombia where he would finish his career.

In 1956, Solano Patiño won the league with Deportes Quindío. He is one of the all-time Colombian league's leading goal-scorers with 147 goals.

Personal
Solano Patiño died in June 1990.

References

External links
 

1923 births
1990 deaths
Paraguayan footballers
Paraguayan expatriate footballers
Club Sol de América footballers
Club Guaraní players
Club Atlético Huracán footballers
Deportes Quindío footballers
Deportivo Pereira footballers
Deportivo Cali footballers
Categoría Primera A players
Expatriate footballers in Colombia
Paraguayan football managers
América de Cali managers
Deportivo Cali managers
Association football forwards
Argentine emigrants to Paraguay